Gheorghe Pirvan (born 29 January 1976 in Voinești, Dâmbovița) is a Romanian rower.

References 
 
 

1976 births
Living people
Romanian male rowers
Olympic rowers of Romania
Rowers at the 2000 Summer Olympics
World Rowing Championships medalists for Romania